Eterusia aedea, the red slug caterpillar, is a species of moth in the family Zygaenidae. It was described by Carl Linnaeus in his 1763 Centuria Insectorum. It is found in Sri Lanka, India, Nepal, Taiwan, Japan and China.

Description
The wingspan is about 50 mm for males and 56 mm for females. They have a semi-diurnal habit and rather elongated narrow body. The first two segments of the abdomen are black, and there are no dorsal bands in the male. The forewings are dark green. The basal black area of the hindwings is larger, reducing the width of the yellow band, which is very pale. The end of the abdomen is black in the male.

Ecology
The larvae have been recorded feeding on a wide range of plants, including Bischofia javanica, Aporosa lindleyana, Aporosa villosa, Cornus florida, Lagerstroemia, Melastoma candidum, Myrica rubra, Sloanea formosana, Rhododendron, Symplocos glauca, Camellia (including C. japonica, C. sasanqua, C. sinensis, C. oleifera), Eurya japonica, Eurya septata, Cleyera japonica and Buddleja. The larvae of subspecies aedea, sinica, formosana, cingala and virescens have been reported as pests on tea.

Subspecies
Eterusia aedea aedea (Bangladesh, India)
Eterusia aedea sinica Ménétriés, 1857 (China)
Eterusia aedea cingala Moore, 1877 (Sri Lanka)
Eterusia aedea virescens (Butler, 1881) (southern India)
Eterusia aedea formosana Jordan, 1907 (Taiwan)
Eterusia aedea sugitanii Matsumura, 1927 (Japan: Okinoshima)
Eterusia aedea micromaculata Inoue, 1982 (Japan: Tokara Islands)
Eterusia aedea tomokunii Owada, 1989 (Japan: Amami-oshima)
Eterusia aedea sakaguchii Matsumura, 1927 (Japan: Okinawa Island)
Eterusia aedea okinawana Matsumura, 1931 (Japan: Ishigaki Island)
Eterusia aedea masatakasatoi Owada, 2001 (Japan: Nakanoshima Island)
Eterusia aedea hamajii Owada, 2001 (Japan: Tokunoshima Island)
Eterusia aedea azumai Owada, 2001 (Japan: Kumejima Island)

Gallery

References

External links
The pupa of Eterusia aedea (Clerck, 1759) (Lepidoptera, Zygaenidae, Chalcosiinae): Morphology and phylogenetic implications

Moths described in 1763
Chalcosiinae
Moths of Japan
Taxa named by Carl Linnaeus